Jaroslav Doubrava (April 25, 1909 in Chrudim – October 2, 1960 in Prague) was a Czech composer, painter, and pedagogue.

He studied in the Prague Conservatory with Otakar Jeremiáš. His works are typified by somber, yet dramatic, music in the Romantic style. His Third Symphony''' (1957) and ballet Don Quijote (1955) are some of his most popular works. Doubrava was heavily influenced by Bohemian  and Moravian folklore as seen in his opera, Ballad on Love (1960). Doubrava was also well known for his satires, especially the ballet King Lávra (1951), Lazy Honza and The Christening of St. Vladimir''.

Notes

References
Short Biography

External links
Life and Legacy of Jaroslav Doubrava
Extensive Biography and Selection of Works

1909 births
1960 deaths
Czech composers
Czech male composers
20th-century composers
20th-century Czech painters
Czech male painters
20th-century Czech male musicians
20th-century Czech male artists